Massachusetts's 6th congressional district is located in northeastern Massachusetts. It contains most of Essex County, including the North Shore and Cape Ann, as well as part of Middlesex County. It is represented by Seth Moulton, who has represented the district since January 2015. The shape of the district went through minor changes effective from the elections of 2012 after Massachusetts congressional redistricting to reflect the 2010 census. The towns of Tewksbury and Billerica were added, along with a small portion of the town of Andover.

Election results from presidential races

Cities and towns in the district
In Essex County:
The cities of: Amesbury, Beverly, Gloucester, Lynn, Newburyport, Peabody, and Salem
The towns of: Andover: Precincts 1, 7A and, 8 Boxford, Danvers, Essex, Georgetown, Groveland, Hamilton, Ipswich, Lynnfield, Manchester, Marblehead, Merrimac, Middleton, Nahant, Newbury, North
Andover, Rockport, Rowley, Salisbury, Saugus, Swampscott, Topsfield, Wenham, and West Newbury.

In Middlesex County:
The towns of: Bedford, Billerica, Burlington, North Reading, Reading, Tewksbury, Wakefield and Wilmington.

Cities and towns in the district prior to 2013

1840s
"Amherst, Belchertown, East-Hampton, Enfield, Granby, Greenwich, Hadley, Hatfield, Northampton, Pelham, Prescott, South Hadley, and Ware, in the County of Hampshire; Brimfield, Holland, Longmeadow, Ludlow, Monson, Palmer, Southwick, Springfield, Wales, Westfield, West Springfield, and Wilbraham, in the County of Hampden; Bernardston, Deerfield, Erving, Gill, Greenfield, Leverett, Montague, New Salem, Northfield, Orange, Shutesbury, Sunderland, Warwick, Wendell, and Whately in the County of Franklin; and Athol and Royalston, in the County of Worcester."

1850s
"The cities of Lynn, Newburyport, and Salem, and the towns of Amesbury, Beverly, Essex, Georgetown, Gloucester, Groveland, Hamilton, Ipswich, Manchester, Marblehead, Newbury, Rockport, Rowley, Salisbury, Wenham, and West Newbury, in the county of Essex."

1890s
"Suffolk County: City of Boston, wards 3, 4, and 5, and the towns of Chelsea, Revere, and Winthrop. Middlesex County: Towns of Everett, Malden, Medford, Melrose, Reading, Stoneham, Wakefield, and Winchester. Essex County: Towns of Lynn, Nahant, Saugus, and Swampscott."

1910s
"Essex County: Cities of Beverly, Gloucester, Haverhill, Newburyport, and Salem; towns of Amesbury, Danvers, Essex, Georgetown, Groveland, Hamilton, Ipswich, Manchester, Marblehead, Merrimac, Newbury, Rockport, Rowley, Salisbury, Swampscott, Topsfleld, Wenham, and West Newbury."

1920s–1980s

1990s
"Counties: Essex, Middlesex. Cities and townships: Amesbury, Bedford, Beverly, Boxford, Burlington, Danvers, Essex, Georgetown, Gloucester, Groveland, Hamilton, Haverhill, Ipswich, Lynn, Lynnfield, Manchester by the Sea, Marblehead, Merrimac, Middleton, Nahant, Newbury, Newburyport, North Andover, North Reading, Peabody, Reading (part), Rockport, Rowley, Salem, Salisbury, Saugus, Swampscott, Topsfield, Wenham, West Newbury, and Wilmington."

2003 to 2013

In Essex County:
The cities of: Amesbury, Beverly, Gloucester, Lynn, Newburyport, Peabody, and Salem
The towns of: Boxford, Danvers, Essex, Georgetown, Groveland, Hamilton, Ipswich, Lynnfield, Manchester, Marblehead, Merrimac, Middleton, Nahant, Newbury, North
Andover, Rockport, Rowley, Salisbury, Saugus, Swampscott, Topsfield, Wenham, and West Newbury.

In Middlesex County:
The towns of: Bedford, Billerica, Burlington, North Reading, Reading, Wakefield and Wilmington.

List of members representing the district

Recent election results
The following are the results from the last four general elections for U.S. House of Representatives to represent the Massachusetts's 6th Congressional District:

References

 
 
 Congressional Biographical Directory of the United States 1774–present

External links
 
 

06
Government of Essex County, Massachusetts
Government of Middlesex County, Massachusetts
1789 establishments in Massachusetts
Constituencies established in 1789